Eva Diana Kidisyuk (born 31 March 2014), known online as ✿ Kids Diana Show, is a Ukrainian-American YouTuber. Together with her brother Roma (born 22 October 2012) and parents Volodymyr and Olena, she hosts several YouTube channels producing roleplay-oriented children's content. Her main channel is the 6th most-viewed and 6th most-subscribed in the world.

Content
Diana's content includes children's songs, unboxings, vlogging, educational entertainment, and roleplays. Her older brother, Roma Kidisyuk, runs a YouTube channel entitled ★ Kids Roma Show. She also has a younger brother, Oliver Kidisyuk (born 12 December 2020). Her family's channels are dubbed into many languages, including Hindi, Japanese, Indonesian, Russian, Spanish, German, Portuguese, and Arabic.

Diana was nominated for the 2020 tenth annual Streamy Awards in the Kids and Family category and the 2021 Short Awards in the Parenting, Family and Kids category.

History
Olena and Volodymyr Kidisyuk started making YouTube videos as a hobby when Diana's brother, Roma, was born. Born in Kyiv, Ukraine, Diana first appeared in a video in 2015 when Olena launched a YouTube channel to share videos of Diana with friends and family. The channel quickly grew, hitting 1M subscribers in just over a year. In 2017, both parents left their jobs to focus full-time on their YouTube channel and later relocated to Miami, Florida.

In May 2020, Diana's parents signed a deal with Pocket.Watch, a startup children's media company founded in 2016 by Chris Williams and Albie Hecht. It has spearheaded Love, Diana — The Princess Of Play, a franchise based around their brand including an animated series, mobile game, and merchandise based on their channel's brands.

Love, Diana is a live-action animated series consisting of short stories set in the fictional "Land of Play" that follows Diana and Roma as they protect friends and family from characters symbolizing demonized boredom. The show is distributed on YouTube and OTT services like Amazon Prime Video, The Roku Channel, and Samsung TV+.

Awards and nominations

References

2014 births
Living people
YouTube channels launched in 2015
American YouTubers
Ukrainian YouTubers